Truth Rising is the eighth studio album by American rock band Hed PE and the final album the band recorded with Suburban Noize Records, which the band describes as having "imploded on itself" in 2010.

Released on October 26, 2010, the album received mixed reviews and debuted at #98 on the Billboard 200. The album also peaked #13 on the Top Independent albums charts.

Music and lyrics

The music of Truth Rising primarily fuses hard rock, heavy metal, hip hop, funk, reggae and punk rock. It also features elements of blues and industrial. Jared Gomes' vocal style ranges from melodic singing to rapping and death growls. The album continues the band's increasingly political lyrical message, drawing thematic material from the 9/11 Truth movement. Religion and sex are also discussed. Gomes states that the "truth" referred to in the album's title refers to "a lot of different things. One of it is trying to sift through all the political catch phrases and junk. There’s also the organized religion component, there’s the E.T. reality component and then there’s blind consumerism. It’s a broad concept."

"No Rest for the Wicked" was recorded especially for the compilation Major Pain 2 Indee Freedom: The Best of Hed P.E., and features a chorous reminiscent of The Police. The band purchased new recording material for the song, which premiered on Noisecreep. Sevendust singer Lajon Witherspoon contributed guest vocals to the song "Stand Up". Gomes described "Takeover" as a battle rap; he also stated that the lyrical themes were lighter than the rest of the album.

Music videos
The video for "It's All Over" was presented in September 2011 as a plasticine animation. It shows the members of the band being made of plasticine and driving their car. It also has scenes in some house with Hed PE musicians binding a girl with ropes and killing a man with an angle grinder. Closer to the end it shows a battle between Jahred's character and some beast with a sword.

Reviews

411mania gave the album a 6.5 rating, describing parts of the album as "disjointed"; the punk and hip hop tracks were deemed to be the weakest on the album. Allmusic wrote that "all the mishmashing makes Truth Rising even more inconsistent and alienating than usual." Kik Axe Music gave the album 3 out of 5, stating that the sexual references in the latter part of the album diminished the sincerity of the band's message. OC Reloaded wrote, "Despite the overly profane lyrics used in a few select songs, Truth Rising has a lot to offer. The general message Hed PE sends about getting involved in socio-political matters is an admirable one. Whether or not you agree with Hed PE’s views, you should still get involved. Musically, Truth Rising contains enough variety to provide something to enjoy for everyone."

Track listing

Personnel

(Hed) Planet Earth
 Jared Gomes — Vocals
 Jaxon Benge — Guitar
 DJ Product © 1969 — Turntables
 Mawk (Mark Young) — Bass
 Trauma — Drums

Production
Produced by Jahred Gomes, Kevin Zinger & Brad Xavier
Recorded by Lance Eichler & Rory Graham, @ Trackhouse Studios, Orange County, California
Vocals recorded @ Greensprings Studios, Orange County, California
Mixed by Jahred Gomes, @ Greensprings Studios, Orange County, California
Mastered by Mike Lazer, @ Paramount Studios
Management by Kevin Zinger & Ivory Daniel (The Regime)
Layout & design by poabdesigns.com
Art supervision by Jahred Gomes & poabdesigns.com

References

2010 albums
Hed PE albums
Suburban Noize Records albums